This is a list of women photographers who were born in Spain or whose works are closely associated with that country.

A
Laia Abril (born 1986), photographer, multiplatform storyteller
Pilar Albarracín (born 1968), multidisciplinary artist, photographer
Eulalia Abaitua Allende-Salazar (1853–1943), early Basque photographer
Ana Arce (born 1964), photographer, curler
Pilar Aymerich i Puig (born 1943), Catalan photographer, photojournalist

C
Colita (born 1940), photographer specializing in dance and portraits
Irene Cruz (born 1987), photographer and video artist

G
Cristina García Rodero (born 1949), documentary photographer
Carlota Guerrero (born 1989), artist, photographer and filmmaker

L
Ouka Leele (born 1957), photographer, poet
Amalia López Cabrera (1837–after 1866), pioneering professional photographer

M
Inka Martí (born 1964), journalist, editor, writer, and photographer
Cristina Martín Lara (born 1972), photographer, based in Berlin
Cristina de Middel (born 1975), documentary photographer, artist, based in London
Isabel Muñoz (born 1951), photographer, producing black-and-white photos of people such as bull-fighters, dancers or warriors

N
Anaïs Napoleón (c.1827–c.1916), early French-born photographer producing daguerreotypes in Spain
Nath-Sakura (born 1973), transgender Catalan reporter, photographer

O
Cristina Otero (born 1995), photographer, artist, specializing in self-portraits

P
Josefa Pla Marco (died 1870), pioneering professional photographer

R
Lua Ribeira (born 1986), feminist photographer

S
Benedicta Sánchez (born 1935), photographer and actress

U
Amalia Ulman (born 1989), Argentine-born Spanish contemporary artist

See also
List of women photographers

-
Spanish women photographers, List of
Photographers, List of Spanish
Photographers